Bassoon refers to a musical instrument.

Bassoon may also refer to:

 Bassoon, a three-stage thermonuclear device tested as the Zuni shot of Operation Redwing
 Bassoon Prime, a three-stage thermonuclear device tested as the Tewa shot of Operation Redwing
 Christiaan Basson, a South African golfer